Mireille Schurch (born 4 January 1949, Lignerolles, Allier) was a member of the Senate of France, representing the Allier department as a member of the Communist, Republican, and Citizen Group (Union des communistes de France marxiste-léniniste; UCFml).

Biography

Professor of secondary-school physics, she entered parliamentary politics following Pierre Goldberg, the former deputy mayor of Montlucon, after having been, since May 68, a militant Maoist with the UCFml. She was elected mayor of Lignerolles in 1995. On July 11, 2004, she was counsel general for the canton of Montlucon-Sud.

References
Page on the Senate website
Mireille SCHURCH website

People from Allier
1949 births
Living people
French Senators of the Fifth Republic
Senators of Allier
French Maoists
Women members of the Senate (France)
Women mayors of places in France
20th-century French women politicians
21st-century French women politicians